Piastowo may refer to the following places:
Piastowo, Greater Poland Voivodeship (west-central Poland)
Piastowo, Kuyavian-Pomeranian Voivodeship (north-central Poland)
Piastowo, Subcarpathian Voivodeship (south-east Poland)
Piastowo, Lubusz Voivodeship (west Poland)
Piastowo, Warmian-Masurian Voivodeship (north Poland)
Piastowo, Przasnysz County (north Poland)